Earl Miller may refer to:

Earl Miller (bodyguard) (born c. 1896), bodyguard to future US First Lady Eleanor Roosevelt
Earl Miller (ice hockey) (1905–1936), Canadian ice hockey player
Earl K. Miller (born 1962), American neuroscientist
Earl R. Miller, American diplomat

See also
Earl Burns Miller Japanese Garden in Long Beach, California